General Lawrence may refer to:

Charles Lawrence (British Army officer) (1709–1760), British Army brigadier general
Craig Lawrence (born 1963), British Army major general
George St Patrick Lawrence (1804–1884), British Indian Army lieutenant general
Herbert Lawrence (1861–1943), British Army general
James F. Lawrence Jr. (1918–2006), U.S. Marine Corps brigadier general
Richard D. Lawrence (1930–2016), U.S. Army lieutenant general
Stringer Lawrence (1698–1775), British East India Company major general

See also
Attorney General Lawrence (disambiguation)
Christopher St Lawrence, 10th Baron Howth (c. 1568–1619), Anglo-Irish general
Richard St Lawrence, 7th Baron Howth (c. 1510–1558), Irish general